Westmount is an older inner city neighbourhood located near the centre of Saskatoon, Saskatchewan, Canada. It mostly consists of low-density, single detached dwellings. As of 2009, the area is home to 2,232 residents. The neighbourhood is considered a lower-income area, with an average family income of $44,729, an average dwelling value of $162,491 and a home ownership rate of 68.9%.
According to MLS data, the average sale price of a home as of 2013 was $207,347.

History
The area that now makes up Westmount was settled by homesteaders in 1884, as the east bank settlement of Saskatoon struggled for survival. A settler named Archibald L. Brown was one such landowner, owning a section of land where Westmount School would later be built. The neighbourhood was within the city limits when the City of Saskatoon incorporated in 1906. At that time it was the city's northwest corner, hence the name. The streets in Westmount are named for early settlers of the Saskatoon area, and most of the houses were built prior to 1960.

The neighbourhood appeared on a surveyors' map in 1911. The current boundaries of Westmount include some of an area called Ruskin Place, which appears on a 1913 map of registered subdivisions.

Westmount School was opened on April 3, 1913. It was designed by architect David Webster, who designed six of Saskatoon's Collegiate Gothic style elementary schools between 1910 and 1914. E.D. Feehan High School was opened in 1967, and named in honour of Edward Daniel Feehan, a former superintendent of separate schools in Saskatoon. It is designated a bilingual English and Ukrainian school, and also has classes in Cree and Spanish.

McMillan Avenue, which forms part of Westmount's western boundary, is named for Frank McMillan. He was a Toronto businessman who moved to Saskatoon, owned several successful businesses, and built several landmark buildings downtown. He would serve as Saskatoon's mayor and later a Member of Parliament.

Development prior to 1927 was haphazard, which sometimes resulted in irregularity between neighbourhood streets between Westmount and Caswell Hill.  In 1927, the first formal town planning board was established. Westmount was zoned Residence A District, which limited development to one and two-family houses of no more than two-and-a-half storeys.

In its recent history, Westmount has become a lower-income inner city neighbourhood. It and other core neighbourhoods have been the recipients of affordable housing and community economic development initiatives to improve the lives of residents.

Government and politics
Westmount exists within the federal electoral district of Saskatoon West. It is currently represented by Sheri Benson of the New Democratic Party, first elected in 2015.

Provincially, the area is within the constituency of Saskatoon Centre. It is currently represented by David Forbes of the Saskatchewan New Democratic Party, first elected in 2001.

In Saskatoon's non-partisan municipal politics, Westmount lies within ward 2. It is currently represented by Hilary Gough, first elected in 2016.

Institutions

Education

 Westmount Community School – public elementary, part of the Saskatoon Public School Division.
 E. D. Feehan Catholic High School – Catholic secondary school, part of the Greater Saskatoon Catholic School Division.

Other
 Oliver Lodge – Special care home, created by the United Church in 1949.

Parks and recreation
 Westmount Park – 
 Pierre Radisson Park – 
 Leif Erickson Park – 
 Scott Park – 

The Westmount Community Association works to enhance the quality of life for its residents. It promotes and coordinates leisure programs and social activities, and provides a voice for the community on issues of local concern. A number of seasonal programs are offered at Westmount Community School, also the site of the outdoor rink.

Commercial
Businesses in Westmount are almost exclusively located along 22nd Street. 35 home-based businesses are also based in the neighbourhood.

Location
Westmount is located within the Core Neighbourhoods Suburban Development Area.  It is bounded by 22nd Street to the south and Avenue H to the east, 31st Street to the north and Avenue P to the west. Roads are laid out in a grid fashion; streets run east-west, avenues run north-south.

References

External links

 Westmount Community Association
 Westmount neighbourhood profile – 2009
 Westmount Local Area Plan

Neighbourhoods in Saskatoon